Óscar Eduardo Henríquez  (born January 28, 1974) is a Venezuelan former relief pitcher in Major League Baseball who played for the Houston Astros (1997), Florida Marlins (1998) and Detroit Tigers (2002) in parts of three seasons spanning 1997–2002. Listed at 6' 6", 220 lb., Henríquez batted and threw right handed. He was born in La Guaira, Vargas.

Career
Henríquez was signed as a free agent by the Astros in 1991. Because of his immense size and overpowering fastball, Henríquez became a celebrity in his native Venezuela, where he was dubbed Manacho.

In 1995, Henríquez was diagnosed with myasthenia gravis, a rare disorder that affects the nervous system and causes muscle weakness. He had a surgery to remove the thymus gland in the upper neck, and later came down with pneumonia in both lungs. But Henriquez recovered and told the Astros he would be back, and the organization stood by him.

In a 49-game career, Henríquez posted a 1–2 record with a 6.06 ERA and two saves, including 45 strikeouts and 30 walks  in 52 innings of work.

In between, Henríquez played winter ball with the Cardenales de Lara, Navegantes del Magallanes and Tiburones de La Guaira clubs of the Venezuelan League in 12 seasons spanning 1992–2006, and also pitched for the Hyundai Unicorns of Korea Professional Baseball in 2001. In 2005 he pitched for San Marino in the Italian Baseball League.

See also
List of Major League Baseball players from Venezuela

Sources

External links
, or Retrosheet, or Pura Pelota (Venezuelan Winter League)

1974 births
Living people
Asheville Tourists players
Cardenales de Lara players
Charlotte Knights players
Detroit Tigers players
Diablos Rojos del México players
Florida Marlins players
Houston Astros players
Hyundai Unicorns players
KBO League pitchers
Kissimmee Cobras players
Lancaster Barnstormers players
Long Island Ducks players
Major League Baseball pitchers
Major League Baseball players from Venezuela
Mexican League baseball pitchers
Navegantes del Magallanes players
New Orleans Zephyrs players
Norfolk Tides players
People from La Guaira
Piratas de Campeche players
T & A San Marino players
Tiburones de La Guaira players
Toledo Mud Hens players
Venezuelan expatriate baseball players in Italy
Venezuelan expatriate baseball players in Mexico
Venezuelan expatriate baseball players in South Korea
Venezuelan expatriate baseball players in the United States
Venezuelan expatriate baseball players in San Marino